is a female Japanese voice actress and singer. After graduating from high school, she entered the Earth Star Entertainment agency and was very well received in the industry work in voice acting. She attended Shoto Actors Gymnasium. She is best known for voicing Nasuno Takamiya in the Teekyu series, Maria in Pupa and Misaki Toyoda in Wanna Be the Strongest in the World.

Filmography

Television animation
 2012
 Gon (manga) – Prairie dog child
 Sengoku Collection – Dancer (ep 2)
 Teekyu series – Nasuno Takamiya
 World War Blue – Crystal

 2013
 Amnesia – Ikki Fan (6 episodes)
 Wanna Be the Strongest in the World – Misaki Toyoda
 Brothers Conflict – Audience Member A (ep 5); Female Student C (ep 2)
 Mangirl! – Maid manager
 Encouragement of Climb series – Classmate B (ep 1); Climber B (ep 9); Mother (ep 3); Additional Voices

 2014
 Nobunagun – Classmate (ep 3); Maria Williams (eps 1, 4-5, 7-13)
 Pupa – Maria

 2016
 ReLIFE – Female Student (eps 2, 4); Girl (eps 1, 5); Girl B (ep 1); Volleyball Club Member B (ep 8)

References

External links 
 

1986 births
Living people
Japanese video game actresses
Japanese voice actresses
Voice actresses from Tokyo
21st-century Japanese singers
21st-century Japanese women singers